Germanite is a rare copper iron germanium sulfide mineral, Cu26Fe4Ge4S32.  It was first discovered in 1922, and named for its germanium content.  It is only a minor source of this important semiconductor element, which is mainly derived from the processing of the zinc sulfide mineral sphalerite.  Germanite contains gallium, zinc, molybdenum, arsenic, and vanadium as impurities.

Its type locality is the Tsumeb Mine in Namibia where it occurs in a hydrothermal polymetallic ore deposit in dolomite in association with renierite, pyrite, tennantite, enargite, galena, sphalerite, digenite, bornite and chalcopyrite. It has also been reported from Argentina, Armenia, Bulgaria, Cuba, Democratic Republic of Congo (Zaire), Finland, France, Greece, Japan, Republic of Congo (Brazzaville), Russia and the United States.

References

Copper minerals
Iron minerals
Sulfide minerals
Germanium minerals
Cubic minerals
Minerals in space group 218